Sergio Sánchez Pérez (born 30 October 1995) is a Spanish footballer who plays for CD Izarra as a forward.

Club career
Born in Ansó, Huesca, Aragon, Sánchez was a SD Huesca youth graduate. On 20 April 2014, while still a junior, he made his first-team debut by coming on as a second-half substitute for Tariq Spezie and scoring his team's second in a 3–2 away win against Atlético Madrid B in the Segunda División B.

Sánchez moved to Real Madrid in July 2014, after having previously agreed a contract in April; he was assigned to the C-team in the Tercera División. On 5 July of the following year he joined another reserve team, CA Osasuna B still in the fourth tier.

On 16 December 2015, after discovering a heart problem, Sánchez announced his retirement from football at the age of 20. The following 18 October, he returned to action with AD Sabiñánigo.

Sánchez returned to Huesca in June 2017, being initially assigned to the farm team. He made his professional debut on 6 September, replacing Íñigo López in a 0–2 home loss against Real Valladolid in the season's Copa del Rey.

He joined SD Tarazona on 1 January 2019 on loan for the rest of the season. He joined the club on a permanent basis at the end of the loan spell.

References

External links

1995 births
Living people
People from Jacetania
Sportspeople from the Province of Huesca
Spanish footballers
Footballers from Aragon
Association football forwards
Segunda División B players
Tercera División players
SD Huesca footballers
Real Madrid C footballers
CA Osasuna B players
AD Sabiñánigo players
AD Almudévar players
CD Teruel footballers
SD Tarazona footballers
CD Izarra footballers